The 2011 Rutgers Scarlet Knights football team represented Rutgers University in the 2011 NCAA Division I FBS football season. The Scarlet Knights were led by 11th year head coach Greg Schiano and played their home games at High Point Solutions Stadium. They are a member of the Big East Conference. They finished the season 9–4, 4–3 in Big East play to finish in a tie for fourth place. They were invited to the Pinstripe Bowl where they defeated Iowa State 27–13.

Schedule

References

Rutgers
Rutgers Scarlet Knights football seasons
Pinstripe Bowl champion seasons
Rutgers Scarlet Knights football